The Cape Flats Line is a commuter rail line in Cape Town, South Africa, operated by Metrorail Western Cape. It connects central Cape Town with the suburbs of Pinelands, Athlone, Lansdowne, Ottery and Retreat.

Route
The Cape Flats Line service begins at the central Cape Town railway station, from which it runs east along the Cape Town–Bellville main line as far as Maitland. After Maitland station it branches off to the south, passing along the western edge of Pinelands before crossing under the N2 freeway and over the Black River. It then continues south through Athlone and Lansdowne, and then south-west through Ottery and Southfield, before joining the Southern Line route at Heathfield. Services on the Cape Flats Line terminate at occasionally at Heathfield, with the line terminus being Retreat, except for a few trains per day which continue along the Southern Line to Fish Hoek.

Operation
The line is made up of double  track, electrified with 3,000 V DC overhead catenary. Services are operated mostly by electric multiple units of Class 5M2.

References

Metrorail (South Africa)
Railway lines in South Africa
3 ft 6 in gauge railways in South Africa